Augusto Tiezzi (1910–1990) was an Italian cinematographer who worked on more than 70 films during his career including Hercules and the Masked Rider (1963).

Selected filmography
 Villafranca (1934)
 The Two Sergeants (1936)
 White Amazons (1936)
 No Man's Land (1939)
 The Sin of Rogelia Sanchez (1940)
 Saint Rogelia (1940)
 Guilt Is Not Mine (1952)
 What Price Innocence? (1952)
 It Takes Two to Sin in Love (1954)
 Barrier of the Law (1954)
 The Island Monster (1954)
 Tears of Love (1954)
 The Knight of the Black Sword (1956)
 Serenata a Maria (1957)
 Attack of the Moors (1959)
 Queen of the Seas (1961)
 Hercules and the Masked Rider (1963)
 Assault on the State Treasure (1967)
 The Son of Black Eagle (1968)

References

Bibliography 
 Klossner, Michael. The Europe of 1500-1815 on film and television. McFarland & Co, 2002.

External links 
 

1910 births
1990 deaths
Italian cinematographers